Inga (2014) is an Indian English novel written by Poile Sengupta. The story of the novel revolves around the life and struggles of Rapa, a Tamil Brahmin woman.

Sengupta is mainly known as a playwright and a theatre personality. "Inga" was her debut novel. The book was officially released on 30 October 2014 at Bangalore India.

Plot 
Rapa was born and brought up in Delhi. In her education life, she gets introduced to foreign (English) literature, that she finds "fascinating".

Release 
This book was officially released on 30 October 2014 at Bangalore, India. In this event Indian writer Shashi Deshpande will release the book and Chiranjiv Singh, a former Ambassador to UNESCO will receive the first copy of it.

References

External links 
 Inga at Google Books (preview available)

2014 Indian novels
Novels set in India
Novels about Indian women
2014 debut novels
Westland Books books